Municipal Corporations Act (with its variations) is a stock short title used in  the United Kingdom for legislation relating to municipal corporations.

List
The Municipal Corporations Act 1835 (5 & 6 Will 4 c 76)
The Municipal Corporation (Boundaries) Act 1836 (6 & 7 Will 4 c 103)
The Municipal Corporation (Borough Fund) Act 1836 (6 & 7 Will 4 c 104)
The Municipal Corporation (Justices, &c.) Act 1836 (6 & 7 Will 4 c 105)
The Municipal Corporation (General) Act 1837 (7 Will 4 & 1 Vict c 78)
The Municipal Corporation (Watch Rate) Act 1837 (7 Will 4 & 1 Vict c 81)
The Municipal Corporation (Benefices) Act 1838 (1 & 2 Vict c 31)
The Municipal Corporation (Borough Courts) Act 1839 (2 & 3 Vict c 27)
The Municipal Corporation (Watch Rate) Act 1839 (2 & 3 Vict c 28)
The Municipal Corporation (Watch Rate) Act 1840 (3 & 4 Vict c 28)
The Municipal Corporation Act 1843 (6 & 7 Vict c 89)
The Municipal Corporation (Rates) Act 1845 (8 & 9 Vict c 110)
The Municipal Corporation (Incorporation) Act 1850 (13 & 14 Vict c 42)
The Municipal Corporation (Bridges) Act 1850 (13 & 14 Vict c 64)
The Municipal Corporation (Justices) Act 1850 (13 & 14 Vict c 91)
The Municipal Corporation Act 1853 (16 & 17 Vict c 79)
The Municipal Corporation Act 1857 (20 & 21 Vict c 50)
The Municipal Corporations Acts Amendment Act 1861 (24 & 25 Vict c 75)
The Municipal Corporation (Recorders) Act 1869 (32 & 33 Vict c 23)
The Municipal Corporation (Election) Act 1869 (32 & 33 Vict c 55)
The Municipal Corporations Act 1859 Amendment Act (34 & 35 Vict c 67)
The Municipal Corporations Evidence Act 1873 (36 & 37 Vict c 33)
The Municipal Corporations (New Charters) Act 1877 (40 & 41 Vict c 69)
The Municipal Corporations Act 1882 (45 & 46 Vict c 50)
The Municipal Corporations Act 1883 (46 & 47 Vict c 18)

The Municipal Corporations (Ireland) Acts 1840 to 1888 was the collective title of the following Acts:
The Municipal Corporations (Ireland) Act 1840 (3 & 4 Vict c 108)
The Municipal Corporations (Ireland) Act 1842 (5 & 6 Vict c 104)
The Municipal Corporations (Ireland) Act 1843 (6 & 7 Vict c 93)
The Municipal Corporations Act 1852 (15 & 16 Vict c 5)
The Municipal Corporations Act 1859 (22 Vict c 35)
The Municipal Corporation Mortgages, &c. Act 1860 (23 & 24 Vict c 16)
The Borough Coroners (Ireland) Act 1860 (23 & 24 Vict c 74)
The Borough Clerks of the Peace (Ireland) Act 1868 (31 & 32 Vict c 98)
The Municipal Elections Act 1875 (38 & 39 Vict c 40)
The Municipal Privilege (Ireland) Act 1876 (39 & 40 Vict c 76)
The Municipal Elections (Ireland) Act 1879 (42 & 43 Vict c 53)
The Municipal Voters Relief Act 1885 (48 & 49 Vict c 9)
The Municipal Local Bills (Ireland) Act 1888 (51 & 52 Vict c 34)
The Borough Funds (Ireland) Act 1888 (51 & 52 Vict c 53)

See also
List of short titles

References

Lists of legislation by short title and collective title